This is a list of the 122 cartoons of the Popeye the Sailor film series produced by Paramount Pictures' Famous Studios (later known as Paramount Cartoon Studios) from 1942 to 1957, with 14 in black and white and 108 in color. These cartoons were produced after Paramount took ownership of Fleischer Studios, which originated the Popeye cartoon series in 1933.

All cartoons are one-reel in length (6 to 10 minutes). The first 14 shorts (You're a Sap, Mr. Jap through Cartoons Ain't Human) are in black-and-white. All remaining cartoons, beginning with Her Honor the Mare, are in color. Unlike the Fleischer Studios shorts, the director credits for these shorts represent the actual director in charge of that short's production. The first animator credited handled the animation direction. The numbers listed next to each cartoon continue the numbering of the Fleischer entries.

Popeye the Sailor series

References 

Film series introduced in 1942
Popeye the Sailor (Famous Studios)